The 2009 Newfoundland and Labrador Provincial Men's Curling Championship (Newfoundland and Labrador's men's provincial curling championship) was held from February 3-8 at the Caribou Curling Club in Stephenville, Newfoundland and Labrador. The winning team (skipped by Brad Gushue) represented Newfoundland and Labrador at the 2009 Tim Hortons Brier in Calgary.

Teams

Standings

Results

Draw 1
February 3, 1430

Draw 2
February 3, 2000

Draw 3
February 4, 0930

Draw 4
February 4, 1430

Draw 5
February 4, 2000

Draw 6
February 5, 0930

Draw 7
February 5, 1430

Draw 8
February 5, 2000

Draw 9
February 6, 0930

Draw 10
February 6, 1430

Draw 11
February 6, 2000

Draw 12
February 7, 0930

Tiebreakers
February 7, 2009

February 7, 2009

Playoffs

Gushue must be defeated twice

Semi-final
February 8, 0930

Final
February 8, 1430

External links
Newfoundland and Labrador Curling Association

Newfoundland And Labrador Provincial Mens Curling Championship, 2009
Stephenville, Newfoundland and Labrador
2009 in Newfoundland and Labrador
Curling in Newfoundland and Labrador